Dearest may refer to:

 Dearest (2012 film) (Anata e), a 2012 Japanese film directed by Yasuo Furuhata
 Dearest (2014 film) (Qin Ai De), a 2014 Chinese film directed by Peter Chan
 "Dearest" (Ayumi Hamasaki song)
 Dearest (EP), a 2022 EP by N.Flying
 "Dearest", a 1959 song by Michael Holliday
 "Dearest", a 1971 song by Bee Gees (from the Trafalgar album)